1000 to 1: The Cory Weissman Story is a 2014 American biographical sports drama film directed by Mike Levine and starring David Henrie, Beau Bridges, Cassi Thomson, Hannah Marks, Jean Louisa Kelly, and Luke Kleintank.

Plot 
Cory Weissman was a student-athlete, a basketball player, who had a stroke while attending Gettysburg College. He scored 1000 points in high school and looked forward to success as a starting point guard. Basketball is his life's primary focus, but as a freshman, he has an AVM stroke which paralyzes his left side.  Cory has to cope with his disability and answer the question "why me?"  Does everything happen for a reason or just fate?

Despite the sad prognosis of his brain damage, the young athlete is hopeful of his recovery and return to basketball. Physical therapy is slow, but with the support of his cat, fish, coach and teammates, Cory returns to college.  Cory is allowed to dress and play in the last game his senior year.  To the joy of everyone, he scores one point—hence the title "1000 to 1".  He finds new meaning in his life, both on and off the court. He played hockey and cricket

Cast 
 David Henrie as Cory Weissman
 Luke Kleintank as Brendan "Pops" Trelease, Cory's friend and teammate
 Beau Bridges as Coach 
 Jean Louisa Kelly as Tina Weissman, Cory's mother
 Cassi Thomson as Ally Sullivan, Cory's girlfriend before the injury
 Hannah Marks as Jess Evans, Cory's girlfriend after the injury
 Myk Watford as Marc Weissman, Cory's father

Production 
Principal photography began in October  2012. The film was shot in 20 days, mostly at Gettysburg College.

Release 
The film was released directly to DVD and on demand on March 4, 2014.

References

External links
 

2014 films
2010s sports films
American basketball films
Gettysburg College
2010s English-language films
2010s American films